Richard Lane (May 28, 1899 – September 5, 1982) was an American actor and television announcer/presenter. In movies, he played assured, fast-talking slickers: usually press agents, policemen and detectives, sometimes swindlers and frauds. He is perhaps best known to movie fans as "Inspector Farraday" in the Boston Blackie mystery-comedies. Lane also played Faraday in the first radio version of Boston Blackie, which ran on NBC from June 23, 1944 to September 15, 1944. Lane was an early arrival on television, first as a news reporter and then as a sports announcer, broadcasting wrestling and roller derby shows on KTLA-TV, mainly from the Grand Olympic Auditorium in Los Angeles.

Biography

Early years
Lane was born in 1899 in Rice Lake, Wisconsin to a farm family. Early in life he developed talents for reciting poetry and doing various song-and-dance acts.

By his teenage years, Lane was doing an "iron jaw" routine in circuses around Europe and worked as a drummer touring with a band in Australia. After the decline of vaudeville, Lane found work in motion pictures. He started in small roles but producers and directors saw how well he handled dialogue, and he soon became one of Hollywood's busiest actors, equally skilled at drama and comedy. A shrewd businessman, Lane insisted on a two-week guarantee for every assignment. He might work for only a few days on a picture, but still be paid for the two weeks. This allowed him to accept multiple jobs weekly, and with the extra pay he soon became a seasoned investor. During one six-month period Richard Lane appeared in 29 feature films.

During World War II, he appeared as emcee with USO troops entertaining G.I.s. His unit appeared at Fort MacArthur in September 1944. Lane also announced for the Jalopy Derby and Destruction Derby at Ascot Park, Gardena, California.

Lane appeared in character roles in more than 150 films between 1937 and 1951. He was so firmly established as a rapid-fire sharpie that Columbia Pictures producer Jules White co-starred him with "nervous" comedian Gus Schilling for a series of two-reel slapstick comedies. Schilling and Lane were a popular team at Columbia, second only to The Three Stooges. The series ran from 1945 to 1950.

Lane's only starring roles were in the Schilling and Lane shorts and a single feature film, Devil Ship (1948), in which he played tough ship's captain "Biff Brown."

Work with KTLA
Because he had been working for Paramount Pictures, Lane was able to obtain work at experimental TV station KTLA, which was owned by the studio at the time. When the station went commercial in 1947, Lane appeared before the camera as a news presenter. One of the early highlights of his career was reporting on the first atomic explosion covered by a television newscast.

When KTLA agreed to broadcast wrestling matches from the Olympic Auditorium in 1946, Lane was assigned to comment on the action. He started announcing (as Dick Lane) for Roller Derby in 1951, and for Roller Games for 15 years starting in 1961. Because Lane was part of the Hollywood establishment, he gave Roller Games a measure of respectability. Announcing games for the L.A. Thunderbirds at trackside, with cigarette dangling, Lane's oversized personality became closely associated with the sport. For pro wrestling, his broadcasts featured such personalities as Gorgeous George, Mr. Moto, and Dr. Lee Grable. Contrary to popular opinion it was Lane, not former ABC sports announcer Keith Jackson, who first coined the exclamatory expression "Whoa, Nellie!" when something exciting happened in the ring or on the track. 

In the late 1940s, Lane became a character actor in westerns and outdoor adventures; his role as a tale-spinning windbag alongside bandleader Spade Cooley in the feature film Everybody's Dancin' won him the role of "Leather Britches" on Cooley's TV series for KTLA.

As movie production wound down after World War II, Lane devoted more of his time to television, particularly his wrestling shows. He spoke with great enthusiasm, improvising exotic names for the various wrestling holds, like "the Boston land-crab." When one wrestler pretended to bite the ear of his opponent, Lane would cry, "Meat on the table!" Another call familiar to viewers was "Wow, what action!" which invariably preceded a commercial break.

Later years
After Lane retired from television full-time in 1972, he accepted few offers for screen work; in later years he was typecast as a sports announcer. He did make a notable cameo appearance (as a roller-derby commentator) in Raquel Welch's film Kansas City Bomber. In 1974 he moved to a home in the Deep Well neighborhood of Palm Springs, California.

Lane was among the initial honorees on the Walk of Fame with his official ceremony date being listed as taking place on February 8, 1960.  Lanes's Hollywood Walk of Fame star in on the north side of the 6300 block of Hollywood Boulevard.  

Lane died in Newport Beach, California on September 5, 1982. He was buried in Pacific View Memorial Park, Orange County California. In 1996, Lane was posthumously inducted into the Wrestling Observer Newsletter Hall of Fame. In 2008, Lane was inducted into the 'Announcers Wing' of the Roller Derby Hall of Fame.

Selected filmography

 The Woman I Love (1937) as Florence's Boyfriend (uncredited)
 The Outcasts of Poker Flat (1937) as 'High-Grade'
 You Can't Buy Luck (1937) as Detective Mac McGrath
 There Goes My Girl (1937) as Editor Tim J. Whelan
 You Can't Beat Love (1937) as Iceman (uncredited)
 New Faces of 1937 (1937) as Broker Harry Barnes
 Super-Sleuth (1937) as Tourist Bus Driver
 Flight From Glory (1937) as Mr. Hanson
 The Life of the Party (1937) as Hotel Manager
 Should Wives Work? (1937, Short)
 Saturday's Heroes (1937) as Red Watson
 Danger Patrol (1937) as Bill
 Hitting a New High (1937) as Owner of the Chez Suzette Nightclub (uncredited)
 Wise Girl (1937) as Detective
 Crashing Hollywood (1938) as Hugo Wells
 Everybody's Doing It (1938) as Steve Devers
 Radio City Revels (1938) as Crane
 Bringing Up Baby (1938) as Circus Manager (uncredited)
 Maid's Night Out (1938) as Barker for Octopus Concession (uncredited)
 This Marriage Business (1938) as Joe Selby
 Go Chase Yourself (1938) as Nails
 Joy of Living (1938) as Harvey (uncredited)
 Blind Alibi (1938) as Bowers
 I'm from the City (1938) as Captain Oliver 'Ollie' Fitch
 Carefree (1938) as Henry - Country Club Headwaiter (uncredited)
 Mr. Doodle Kicks Off (1938) as Assistant Coach 'Offsides' Jones
 Exposed (1938) as Tony Mitchell
 His Exciting Night (1938) as Homer Carslake
 The Last Warning (1938) as Steve Felson
 Charlie Chan in Honolulu (1938) as Joe Arnold
 Mr. Moto in Danger Island (1939) as Commissioner Gordon
 Union Pacific (1939) as Sam Reed
 For Love or Money (1939) as Foster
 It Could Happen to You (1939) as District Attorney Gibson
 Unexpected Father (1939) as Leo Murphy - Booking Agent
 Stronger Than Desire (1939) as Jerry Brody
 News Is Made at Night (1939) as Barney Basely
 Mutiny on the Blackhawk (1939) as Kit Carson
 The Day the Bookies Wept (1939) as Ramsey Firpo
 Hero for a Day (1939) as Abbott
 The Escape (1939) as David Clifford
 Sued for Libel (1939) as Smiley Dugan
 Drunk Driving (1939, Short) as Rick
 Main Street Lawyer (1939) as Ballou, Marco's Lawyer
 The Amazing Mr. Williams (1939) as Reagan (uncredited)
 Nick Carter, Master Detective (1939) as Sam Vaughn (uncredited)
 City of Chance (1940) as Marty Connors
 Free, Blonde and 21 (1940) as Lt. Lake
 Two Girls on Broadway (1940) as Buddy Bartell
 Sandy Is a Lady (1940) as Philip Jarvis
 The Biscuit Eater (1940) as Harvey McNeil
 Brother Orchid (1940) as Mugsy O'Day
 Boom Town (1940) as Assistant District Attorney
 Hired Wife (1940) as McNab
 The Bride Wore Crutches (1940) as Bill Daly
 Yesterday's Heroes (1940) as Cleats Slater
 Margie (1940) as Mr. Dixon
 Youth Will Be Served (1940) as Mr. Hewitt
 Ride, Kelly, Ride (1941) as Dan Thomas
 Meet the Chump (1941) as Slugs Bennett
 Meet Boston Blackie (1941) as Inspector John Farraday
 A Girl, a Guy, and a Gob (1941) as Recruiting Officer
 The Penalty (1941) as Craig
 I Wanted Wings (1941) as Flight Commander
 The Cowboy and the Blonde (1941) as Gilbert
 Sunny (1941) as Reporter
 Time Out for Rhythm (1941) as Mike Armstrong
 For Beauty's Sake (1941) as Mr. Jackman
 Tight Shoes (1941) as Allan McGrath
 San Antonio Rose (1941) as Charles J. Willoughby
 Navy Blues (1941) as 'Rocky' Anderson
 Man at Large (1941) as Editor Grundy
 Riders of the Purple Sage (1941) as Steve Oldring
 Confessions of Boston Blackie (1941) as Inspector John Farraday
 Hellzapoppin' (1941) as Director
 Ride 'Em Cowboy (1942) as Pete Conway (uncredited)
 Butch Minds the Baby (1942) as Harry the Horse
 To the Shores of Tripoli (1942) as Lieutenant
 Junior G-Men of the Air (1942, Serial) as Agent Don Ames
 Alias Boston Blackie (1942) as Inspector John Farraday
 Drums of the Congo (1942) as Coutlass
 Dr. Broadway (1942) as Police Sgt. Patrick Doyle
 A-Haunting We Will Go (1942) as Phillips
 Boston Blackie Goes Hollywood (1942) as Inspector John Farraday
 Time to Kill (1942) as Lt. Breeze
 Arabian Nights (1942) as Corporal
 Air Force (1943) as Maj. W.G. Roberts
 It Ain't Hay (1943) as Slicker
 After Midnight with Boston Blackie (1943) as Inspector John Farraday
 Swing Your Partner (1943) as Mr. Lane
 Fired Wife (1943) as Orin Tracy
 Thank Your Lucky Stars (1943) as Barney Johnson (uncredited)
 Corvette K-225 (1943) as Vice Admiral
 Crazy House (1943) as S. E. Hanley
 The Chance of a Lifetime (1943) as Inspector John Farraday
 Gung Ho! (1943) as Captain Dunphy
 Slightly Terrific (1944) as Mike Hamilton
 Bermuda Mystery (1944) as Detective Sergeant Donovan
 Take It Big (1944) as Eddie Hampton
 Louisiana Hayride (1944) as J. Huntington McMasters
 Mr. Winkle Goes to War (1944) as Sgt. 'Alphabet' Czeidrowski
 A Wave, a WAC and a Marine (1944) as Marty Allen
 One Mysterious Night (1944) as Inspector John Farraday
 Bowery to Broadway (1944) as Walter Rogers
 Brazil (1944) as Edward Graham
 What a Blonde (1945) as Pomeroy
 Here Come the Co-Eds (1945) as Near-sighted Man at Ballroom
 Two O'Clock Courage (1945) as Al Haley
 The Horn Blows at Midnight (1945) as Furness - Radio Announcer (uncredited)
 Boston Blackie Booked on Suspicion (1945) as Inspector John Farraday
 The Bullfighters (1945) as 'Hot Shot' Coleman
 Wonder Man (1945) as Assistant District Attorney
 Boston Blackie's Rendezvous (1945) as Inspector John Farraday
 Girl on the Spot (1946) as 'Weepy' McGurk
 A Close Call for Boston Blackie (1946) as Inspector John Farraday
 Talk About a Lady (1946) as Duke Randall
 The Phantom Thief (1946) as Inspector John Farraday
 Pardon My Terror (1946, Short) as Dick
 Gentleman Joe Palooka (1946) as Phillips
 Sioux City Sue (1946) as Jefferson Lang
 Boston Blackie and the Law (1946) as Inspector John Farraday
 Song of Scheherazade (1947) as Lieutenant
 Hit Parade of 1947 (1947) as Serial Director
 Out of the Blue (1947) as Detective Noonan
 Devil Ship (1947) as Capt. 'Biff' Brown
 Tenth Avenue Angel (1948) as Street Vendor
 The Return of the Whistler (1948) as Gaylord Traynor
 Trapped by Boston Blackie (1948) as Inspector John Farraday
 The Babe Ruth Story (1948) as Boston Braves' coach
 The Creeper (1948) as Insp. Fenwick
 He's in Again (1949, Short) as Dick
 Miss Mink of 1949 (1949) as Herbert Pendelton
 Boston Blackie's Chinese Venture (1949) as Inspector John Farraday
 Take Me Out to the Ball Game (1949) as Michael Gilhuly
 Mighty Joe Young (1949) as City Attorney (uncredited)
 That Midnight Kiss (1949) as Radio D.J. (uncredited)
 The Big Wheel (1949) as Reno Riley
 There's a Girl in My Heart (1949) as Sergeant Mullin
 Quicksand (1950) as Lt. Nelson
 Everybody's Dancin' (1950) as Colonel Ed Harrison
 The Jackie Robinson Story (1950) as Clay Hopper, Montreal Manager
 The Admiral Was a Lady (1950) as Marty Gruber
 I Can Get It for You Wholesale (1951) as Kelley
 Visit to a Small Planet (1960) as Superbo Television Spokesman (uncredited)
 The Killers (1964) as Demolition Derby Announcer (uncredited)
 Dear Brigitte (1965) as Racetrack Announcer (uncredited)
 Kansas City Bomber (1972) as Len
 The Shaggy D.A. (1976) as Roller Rink Announcer
 The One and Only (1978) (uncredited) (final film role)

See also 
 O'Connor Plating Works disaster – 1947 news event which Lane covered

References

Sources
 "Dick Lane, Pioneer TV Announcer, Dead at 83", Los Angeles Times, September 6, 1982.

External links

 Rare online clips of Dick Lane calling wrestling matches
 “Whoah, Nellie!” Happy Birthday, Richard “Dick” Lane
 
 Richard Lane at the American Film Institute Catalog
 Richard Lane at Turner Classic Movies
 Richard Lane at AllMovie
 

1899 births
1982 deaths
Male actors from Los Angeles
Male actors from Wisconsin
American male film actors
Television anchors from Los Angeles
People from Rice Lake, Wisconsin
People from Palm Springs, California
Professional wrestling announcers
Roller derby
20th-century American male actors
Burials at Pacific View Memorial Park